Julián Bautista (21 April 1901 – 8 July 1961) was a Spanish composer and conductor. He was a member of Generation of '27 and the Group of Eight, the latter of which also included composers Jesús Bal y Gay, Ernesto Halffter and his brother Rodolfo, Juan José Mantecón, Fernando Remacha, Rosa García Ascot, Salvador Bacarisse and Gustavo Pittaluga. He composed the soundtracks to 37 movies in addition to more than 30 other classical works. He worked actively as a conductor with such orchestras as the Madrid Symphony Orchestra and the Spanish National Orchestra.

Bautista was the son of Julián Bautista Swartz and Ventura Cachaza Vázquez. He began studying solfège at the age of 7 and piano at the age of 11 with Pilar Fernández de la Mora. At the age of 14 he began taking courses in harmony, counterpoint, and fugue at the Madrid Royal Conservatory where he was a pupil of Conrado del Campo.

In 1940 he emigrated to Argentina, where he lived in Buenos Aires.

Works 
{| width=100%
|- valign ="top"
|width=50%|
Sonata para Piano y Violin, 1918–20
Cuarteto para cuerdas, 1918–20
Canciones sobre Poesias de Bécquer, 1918–20
Dos Impresiones Sinfónicas, 1918–20
Interior, a lyrical drama by Maurice Maeterlinck, 1920
La Flute de Jade, 1921
Dos Canciones, 1921
Juerga y Suite de Danzas, 1921
Colores, 1921–22
Premier Cuarteto de Cuerdas, 1922–23
Sonatina-Trio, 1924
Segundo Cuarteto de Cuerdas, 1926
Tres Preludios Japoneses, 1927
Perludio y Danza, 1928
Suite all'Antica, 1932
|width=50%|
Obertura para una Opera Grotesca, 1932
Estrambote, 1933
Primera Sonata concertata a Quattro, 1933–34
Sonata a Tres, 1934–36
Concierto para Piano y Orquestra, 1934–36
Don Perlimplin, 1934–36
Tres Ciudades, 1937
Camino de la Felicidad, 1937–38
Seconda Sonata concertata a Quattro, 1938–39
Fantasia Espanola, 1945
Catro Poemas Galegos, 1946Sinfonía breve, 1956Romance del Rey Don Rodrigo, 1956Segunda Sinfonía "Ricordiana", 1957Tercer Cuarteto de Cuerdas, 1958
|}

Selected filmography
 An Evening of Love (1943)
 Our Natacha (1944)
 The Phantom Lady (1945)
 Back in the Seventies (1945)
 The Earring (1951)Suburb (1951)
 Don't Ever Open That Door'' (1952)

External links
Julián Bautista: website dedicated to his life and work

1901 births
1961 deaths
Spanish composers
Spanish male composers
Spanish conductors (music)
Male conductors (music)
Spanish film score composers
Male film score composers
20th-century conductors (music)
20th-century composers
20th-century Spanish musicians
20th-century Spanish male musicians